Febelgra is the federation of the Belgian printing and communication industry. The organization represents the professional printing and communication sector, and its main objective is to represent and defend the interests of its members.

See also
Brepols
Carta Mundi

External links
 Febelgra
 I love Print

Trade associations based in Belgium
Economy of Belgium